The Mystic River Railroad Bridge is a railroad bridge carrying Amtrak's Northeast Corridor over the Mystic River in Mystic, Connecticut, between the towns of Groton and Stonington.

There have been three bridges at this location. The first bridge was a single-tracked, wooden drawbridge in 1819, which was replaced with a steel swing bridge in 1875.

The current bridge was built in 1984, and is a truss-style swing bridge, providing  of vertical clearance when closed.

The two tracks running over the bridge are owned by Amtrak, are part of its Northeast Corridor route, and are used to operate its Northeast Regional and Acela Express services. There is a proposal, however, to extend Shore Line East Commuter Rail Service from its current terminus in New London to Mystic, which would require crossing this bridge.

The bridge is the easternmost drawbridge on the Amtrak-owned Northeast Corridor in Connecticut.

See also
List of bridges documented by the Historic American Engineering Record in Connecticut

References

External links

Railroad bridges in Connecticut
Historic American Engineering Record in Connecticut
Mystic, Connecticut
New York, New Haven and Hartford Railroad bridges
Bridges in New London County, Connecticut
Amtrak bridges
Steel bridges in the United States